Young Sherlock: The Legacy of Doyle (also referred to as Young Sherlock: Doyle no Isan) is a Japan-exclusive game for the MSX developed by Pack-In-Video and released in 1987. The game is based on the 1985 movie Young Sherlock Holmes, however the plot is completely different from that of the movie.

See also
List of video games based on films

External

1987 video games
Detective video games
Japan-exclusive video games
MSX games
MSX-only games
Pack-In-Video games
Video games based on Sherlock Holmes
Video games based on films
Video games developed in Japan
Video games set in London